Redoutable was a central battery and barbette ship of the French Navy. She was the first warship in the world to use steel as the principal building material. She was preceded by the Colbert-class ironclads and was succeeded by Dévastation-class.

Compared to iron, steel allowed for greater structural strength for a lower weight. France was the first country to manufacture steel in large quantities, using the Siemens process. At that time, steel plates still had some defects, and the outer bottom plating of the ship was made of wrought iron.

All-steel warships were later built by the Royal Navy, with the dispatch vessels Iris and Mercury, laid down in 1875–1876.

Construction

Contemporary description in Scientific American

Crew
Full complement: 30 officers + 679 ratings.

Trials or 1st category reserve: 8 officers + 371 ratings.

2nd category reserve: 5 officers + 139 ratings.

3rd category reserve: 0 officers + 27 ratings.

Service
Redoutable formed part of the French Mediterranean squadron.

Redoutable was present during the negotiation of the Boxer Protocol, a treaty signed on 7 September 1901 with China.

Commanding officers of the Redoutable

Lieutenant Arnauld was the director of movements of the port of Saigon, and commander of the naval auxiliaries and naval barracks.

References

Bibliography

In pop culture 

 The_Rebel_(2007_film) - shown in a postcard early in the film

External links

 French Central Battery Ship Rédoutable (1876/1881) (sic)
Redoubtable at Battleships-Cruisers.co.uk

Ships built in France
1876 ships
Ironclad warships of the French Navy